Anna Moeller is a member of the Illinois House of Representatives who was sworn in March 31, 2014. She previously served on the Elgin City Council and as Executive Director of the McHenry County Council of Governments. She was named an Edgar Fellow in 2012. Anna Moeller graduated from Northern Illinois University with a BA in History and MPA in Public Administration. She represents the 43rd district which includes all or parts of Elgin, Barrington Hills, Carpentersville, East Dundee and South Elgin. Since taking office, Anna Moeller has championed legislation on pay equity for women and people of color, pension reform, environmental protection, access to healthcare and that advance LGBTQ equality.

As of July 3, 2022, Representative Moeller is a member of the following Illinois House committees:

 Appropriations - Human Services Committee (HAPH)
 Elementary & Secondary Education: Administration, Licensing & Charter Schools Committee (HELO)
 Energy & Environment Committee (HENG)
 Health Care Licenses Committee (HHCL)
 (Chairwoman of) Human Services Committee (HHSV)
 Insurance Committee (HINS)
 Special Issues (HS) Subcommittee (HHSV-SPIS)
 Wages & Rates Subcommittee (HAPH-WAGE)

Electoral history

References

External links
Official Illinois General Assembly Page

Living people
Illinois city council members
Democratic Party members of the Illinois House of Representatives
Women state legislators in Illinois
Year of birth missing (living people)
Northern Illinois University alumni
People from Elgin, Illinois
American city managers
21st-century American politicians
21st-century American women politicians
Women city councillors in Illinois